Bromheadia finlaysoniana, commonly known as the pale reed orchid and as Bromheadia pulchra in Australia, is a plant in the orchid family and is native to areas from Indochina to northern Australia. It is a terrestrial orchid with a tough upright, stem and stiffly spreading, elliptic to egg-shaped leaves. There is a long flowering stem with a short zig-zag section near the end where single flowers open in succession.  The flowers are white with a yellow labellum.

Description
Flowering occurs between June and March in Australia and as late as October in New Guinea.

Taxonomy and naming
The pale reed orchid was first formally described in 1833 by John Lindley who gave it the name Grammatophyllum finlaysonianum and published the description in his book The genera and species of Orchidaceous plants. In 1859, Friedrich Miquel changed the name to Bromheadia Finlaysoniana. The specific epithet (finlaysoniana) honours George Finlayson who collected the type specimen.

Distribution and habitat
Bromheadia finlaysoniana has a wide distribution that includes Myanmar, Thailand, Cambodia, Laos, Vietnam, the Malay Peninsula, Singapore, Sumatra, Borneo, Brunei, the Moluccas, New Guinea, the Cape York Peninsula in Queensland, the Anambas Islands and possibly the Philippines, although it's uncertain whether the specimens referred to the Philippines were actually collected there. It grows in wet areas, usually near streams, 0–200 metres altitude. In Queensland, B. finlaysoniana grows from the top of the Cape York Peninsula in the north to Hopevale in the south.

A cDNA for the enzyme dihydroflavonol 4-reductase has been cloned from B. finlaysoniana.

References

Adrorhizinae
Flora of Brunei
Least concern flora of Australia
Orchids of Borneo
Orchids of Myanmar
Orchids of Cambodia
Orchids of Queensland
Orchids of Indonesia
Orchids of Laos
Orchids of Malaysia
Orchids of New Guinea
Orchids of Singapore
Orchids of Sumatra
Orchids of Thailand
Orchids of Vietnam
Plants described in 1833